Marco Bergamo (born 12 April 1964) is an Italian former professional racing cyclist. He rode in one edition of the Tour de France, Giro d'Italia and the Vuelta a España.

References

External links
 

1964 births
Living people
Italian male cyclists
People from Cles
Sportspeople from Trentino
Cyclists from Trentino-Alto Adige/Südtirol